Independence Day Award, Bangladesh's highest civilian honours - Winners, 1990-1999:

1990

Two individuals were awarded.

1991

Three individuals were awarded.

1992

Two individuals and one organization were awarded.

1993

Five individuals were awarded.

1994

Four individuals and one organization were awarded.

1995

Seven individuals were awarded.

1996

Eight individuals were awarded.

1997

Ten individuals were awarded.

1998

1999

References

Civil awards and decorations of Bangladesh